

List

See also
 2008 in Australia
 2008 in Australian television
 List of 2008 box office number-one films in Australia

2008
Australia
Films